José Manuel Barreiro Fernández (born September 18, 1957 in Lugo, Spain) is a Spanish politician and senator. Barreiro is a member of the People's Party of Spain. He was elected senator to represent the Lugo district. He has been senator in the Cortes Generales of Spain since April 1, 2008.

References 

Living people
1957 births
People from Lugo
People's Party (Spain) politicians